Franz Völker (31 March 1899, Neu-Isenburg, Grand Duchy of Hesse – 4 December 1965, Darmstadt, Hesse) was a dramatic tenor who enjoyed a major European career. He excelled specifically as a performer of the  operas of Richard Wagner.

He was discovered by the conductor Clemens Krauss and he studied singing at Frankfurt, where he made his début as Florestan in Beethoven's only operatic work, Fidelio, in 1926. Engagements followed in Vienna, Munich, Berlin, and London, where he appeared at the Royal Opera House, Covent Garden, in 1934 and 1937. He also performed often at the Salzburg Festival and the Bayreuth Festival, earning considerable public and critical acclaim.

Roles that he sang during this period, in addition to Fidelio, included Parsifal, Lohengrin, Siegmund in Wagner's Die Walküre and Max in Weber's Der Freischütz. Later in his career, he sang the lead role in Verdi's Otello. He taught singing in Stuttgart, Germany, after retiring from the stage during the 1950s.

He appears in the title role of a fine complete live recording of Lohengrin, conducted by Robert Heger, made in Berlin in 1942. He made many recordings of operatic arias, duets and scenes. These recordings are now available on CD. They capture the warmth, strength and sensitivity of his singing during its prime and confirm his reputation as one of the finest Germanic tenors of the 20th century.

He also made recordings of popular songs, some of which can be found on YouTube, including "Heute Nacht Oder Nie".

References and notes

External links
 Brief description in German
History of the Tenor – Sound Clips and Narration

1899 births
1965 deaths
People from Neu-Isenburg
German operatic tenors
People from the Grand Duchy of Hesse
20th-century German  male opera singers